Isanthus is a genus of sea anemones in the family Isanthidae.

Species
Species in the genus include:
 Isanthus capensis Carlgren, 1938
 Isanthus homolophilus Chintiroglu & Doumenc, 1998

References

Isanthidae
Hexacorallia genera